American rock singer Phillip Phillips has released three studio albums, one compilation album, three extended plays, seven singles, and five music videos. He won the eleventh season of American Idol in 2012, earning a recording contract with Interscope Records. His winner's single, "Home", became the highest selling single from the Idol in the show's history, with 5.4 million in sales in the United States alone as of 2015.

Two compilations of his performances from American Idol were released: Phillip Phillips: Journey to the Finale and American Idol Season 11 Highlights.  His debut studio album, The World from the Side of the Moon, was released on November 19, 2012, and debuted at #4 on the Billboard 200 with 169,000 copies sold. It was certified Gold in the US in January 2013 and Platinum in August 2013. Phillips's second single, "Gone, Gone, Gone" peaked within the top 40 and become his second consecutive number one on the Adult Contemporary chart.  The song was certified Double Platinum in August 2013. The World From The Side Of The Moon was on the Billboard Top 200 album chart for 61 weeks. That puts in #2 of all the debut albums by American Idol winners.

In 2014, Phillips released "Raging Fire" as the lead single for his second studio album. The song became a top 10 hit on the Adult Pop Songs chart. Behind the Light was released in May 2014 and peaked at number 7 on both the Canadian and American album charts. The album's second single was "Unpack Your Heart". Phillips returned with his third studio album, Collateral, in 2018. The album debuted at number 141 on the Billboard 200 and its lead single, "Miles" peaked at number 15 on the Billboard HAC Chart.

In the United States, Phillips has sold 7.5 million digital singles.  He has also sold 2.7 million albums including ‘album streaming equivalent units’. He has 560 million streams on Spotify and 1.2 billion streams on Pandora.

Albums

Studio albums

Compilation albums

Extended plays

Singles

Other charted songs

Music videos

References

Discographies of American artists
Folk music discographies